The Swan 40 S&S was a Sailing boat designed by Olin Stephens (design number 2025) as the 4th of his to be launched by the brand in 1970.

External links
 Nautor Swan
 Classic Swan Association
 S&S Blog

References

Sailing yachts
Keelboats
1970s sailboat type designs
Sailboat types built by Nautor Swan
Sailboat type designs by Sparkman and Stephens
Sailboat type designs by Olin Stephens